Sharkula (born August 27, 1973) (other alter egos include Thig, Brian Wharton, Thigamahjigee, Sherlock Homeboy, Dirty Gilligan) is a Chicago-area rapper. His lyrics are known for being scatterbrained, discontinuous, free-associative, non-violent, apolitical and random. He is also known as a flâneur for promoting his music and shows via use of hand-made flyers and stickers scattered around vending boxes in Chicago, and street marketing often with phrases such as "Hey, you like Hip-Hop?". He has appeared on Chic-a-Go-Go and his album Martin Luther King Jr. Whopper With Cheese was voted by readers of The Chicago Reader as one of the 20 best albums of 2004.

He has collaborated with Willis Earl Beal, who looks up to Sharkula for inspiration.

in 2016, Sharkula was named runner-up best street character of the year by the Chicago Reader.

Albums
Sharkula w/DJ Felix 2002
New 2003 2003
Roaches On The Eyelid
Musik For To Shady Ass Musik For Yo Soul
Thank You Chicago
Sharkula vs. Dookiehead MCs
Spidermania
Willo & Thig
Thig, The Graduate, and Chuck Sunshine Recorded At 2AM 2004
The 2004 Mix 2004
Martin Luther King Jr. Whopper with Cheese 2004
New 2004 2004
The Longmix 2005
Lo Fidel Castrol Oil GTX Mixalicious Volume 1 2005
Put Your Fins In The Air (Live at the Sub-T) 2005
Thig, The Graduate, and Chuck Sunshine 2005 2005
Session 2006
Pyre 2006
Just For The Wizzard Haters 2006
The 2006 Mix 2006
Holy House Of Fuck 2006
Blizzard Wizzard 2007
Kim Gee 2007
Hand Palm Spring Into Action 2007
Paid Our Dues 2007
The Universe Hurts 2007
Flavor 2007
Don't Look Around 2007
Don't Look Around / Flavor 2007
The Diagnosis of Sharkula 2007
Drunk Skunks 2007
 The Diagnosis of Sharkula 2007 (The Secret Life of Sound) LP
Computers & Beers 2007
New 2008 2008
Black He-Manula 2013 
Dirty Caviar 2015
Prune City 2019BBQ Fingaprints 2020

EPs
 Sharkula & Shami EP 2013 (re-released 2015)

Video
Magic Sundays vol. 1, Directed by Joshua Conro
Magic Sundays vol. 2, Directed by Joshua Conro
Sharkula Special Edition DVD 2008

Sharkula: Diarrhea of a Madman is a 2010 documentary film directed by Joshua Conro about Chicago-based MC Sharkula.

People Interviewed in Sharkula: Diarrhea of a Madman 
PNS of the Molemen
J2K of Flosstradamus
Roburt Reynolds
R-Rock of The Secret Life of Sound
Victor Grigas 
Drunk Odd Kid
PJ Sumroc
Andrew Barber
Polo Jay 
Graduate
Arpad Lep of Jinxremoving Magazine

Image gallery

References

External links
Sharkula Diarrhea of a Madman Film Website
Sharkula in Forbes
Diarrhea of a Madman Article in Chicago Time Out 2010
Sharkula.com featuring flyers and music by the artist
Sharkula .info
Chicago Reader interview
Sharkula on WTTW in Chicago 
http://blog.wfmu.org/freeform/2005/05/what_do_you_thi.html
http://news.medill.northwestern.edu/chicago/news.aspx?id=37903&print=1
Sharkula on Flickr
Army HoDown Music Video
Tractor Reactor Retardtar Sauce Music Video
Break it Down Noun Music Video
 http://chicagostars.bandcamp.com/album/tmnr-ft-sharkula-keter-darker-radius-etc

American rappers
Living people
21st-century American rappers
Rappers from Chicago
1973 births